= Mark Donowitz =

American physiologist

Mark Donowitz is an American physiologist whose research focuses on the gastrointestinal system, gastroenterology, pathophysiology, diarrhea, drugs, and physiology. He currently works at Johns Hopkins University and is an elected Fellow of the American Association for the Advancement of Science.
